The Cactoideae are the largest subfamily of the cactus family, Cactaceae.  Around 80% of cactus species belong to this subfamily. , the internal classification of the family Cactaceae remained uncertain and subject to change. A classification incorporating many of the insights from the molecular studies was produced by Nyffeler and Eggli in 2010. Various revisions have been published since, e.g. to the tribe Hylocereeae and the tribe Echinocereeae. Classifications remained uncertain .

Tribes and genera 
, the National Center for Biotechnology Information used the division of the subfamily into tribes shown below. Some revisions to the circumscriptions of the tribes are also shown.
 Blossfeldieae
 Blossfeldia
 Browningieae
 Armatocereus – Browningia – Neoraimondia – Stetsonia
 Cacteae
 Acharagma – Ariocarpus – Astrophytum – Aztekium – Coryphantha – Cumarinia – Echinocactus – Echinomastus – Epithelantha – Escobaria – Ferocactus – Geohintonia – Glandulicactus – Homalocephala (see Echinocactus) – Kadenicarpus – Leuchtenbergia – Lophophora – Mammillaria – Obregonia – Ortegocactus – Pediocactus – Pelecyphora – Rapicactus – Sclerocactus – Stenocactus – Strombocactus – Thelocactus – Turbinicarpus
 Cereeae
 Arrojadoa – Brasilicereus – Cereus – Cipocereus – Coleocephalocereus – Melocactus – Micranthocereus – Praecereus – Uebelmannia
 Echinocereeae
 (Acanthocereus is placed in Hylocereeae) –Austrocactus – Bergerocactus – Carnegiea – – Cephalocereus – Corryocactus –  Echinocereus – Escontria –  Jasminocereus –  Leptocereus – Lophocereus – Myrtillocactus –  Pachycereus – Peniocereus – Pfeiffera – Pilosocereus – Polaskia –  Stenocereus – Stephanocereus – Strophocactus
 Hylocereeae
 Acanthocereus – Deamia – Disocactus – Epiphyllum – Kimnachia – Pseudorhipsalis – Selenicereus (including Hylocereus) – Weberocereus
 Lymanbensonieae
 Calymmanthium – Lymanbensonia
 Notocacteae
 Copiapoa – Eriosyce – Frailea – Neowerdermannia – Parodia – Thelocephala  – Yavia
 Rhipsalideae
 Hatiora – Lepismium – Rhipsalis – Schlumbergera
 Trichocereeae
 Acanthocalycium – Arthrocereus – Aylostera – Brachycereus – Cleistocactus – Denmoza – Discocactus – Echinopsis – Espostoa – Espostoopsis – Facheiroa – Gymnocalycium – Haageocereus – Harrisia – Leocereus – Matucana – Mila – Oreocereus – Oroya – Pygmaeocereus – Rauhocereus – Rebutia – Reicheocactus – Samaipaticereus –  Weberbauerocereus – Weingartia – Yungasocereus

References 

 
Caryophyllales subfamilies